Kemal Alispahić (born 13 March 1965) is a Bosnian professional football manager and former player.

Playing career
As a player, Alispahić played for Iskra Bugojno, hometown club Željezničar on two occasions, Sloboda Užice, MSV Duisburg, Remscheid, Kayserispor and Lausanne-Sport.

He was part of Iskra Bugojno's golden generation, when the club got promoted from the Yugoslav Second League to the First League in 1984 and also won the 1984–85 edition of the Mitropa Cup.

Managerial career
In his managerial career, Alispahić managed hometown club Sarajevo, Jedinstvo Bihać, Mughan, Al-Ittihad Aleppo, head coached the under-23 and senior Tajikistan national team, Ravan Baku, Čelik Zenica,Jordanian Pro League club Al-Ramtha and most recently, Saudi Arabian side Al-Qaisumah.

The last club he worked in was Tochigi SC Japan.

He was most successful at Al-Ittihad Aleppo, winning the 2010–11 Syrian Cup.
He was the most successful and made the best results at FK Željezničar (Won Championship of Bosnia and Herzegovina for seasons 2000-2001 and 2001-2002, Super Cup of Bosnia and Herzegovina for seasons 2000-2001 and 2002-2003), Sabba Battery Iran (Super Cup for season 2005-2006).

Honours

Player
Iskra Bugojno 
Yugoslav Second League: 1983–84 (West)
Mitropa Cup: 1984–85

Manager
Al-Ittihad Aleppo
Syrian Cup: 2010–11

References

External links
Kemal Alispahić at football database.eu

1965 births
Living people
Footballers from Sarajevo
Association football midfielders
Yugoslav footballers
Bosnia and Herzegovina footballers
NK Iskra Bugojno players
FK Sarajevo players
FK Željezničar Sarajevo players
FK Sloboda Užice players
MSV Duisburg players
FC Remscheid players
Kayserispor footballers
FC Lausanne-Sport players
Yugoslav Second League players
Yugoslav First League players
2. Bundesliga players
Süper Lig players
Swiss Super League players
Yugoslav expatriate footballers
Bosnia and Herzegovina expatriate footballers
Expatriate footballers in Germany
Yugoslav expatriate sportspeople in Germany
Bosnia and Herzegovina expatriate sportspeople in Germany
Expatriate footballers in Turkey
Bosnia and Herzegovina expatriate sportspeople in Turkey
Expatriate footballers in Switzerland
Bosnia and Herzegovina expatriate sportspeople in Switzerland
Bosnia and Herzegovina football managers
FK Sarajevo managers
NK Jedinstvo Bihać managers
FK Mughan managers
Tajikistan national football team managers
Ravan Baku FK managers
NK Čelik Zenica managers
Al-Ramtha SC managers
Premier League of Bosnia and Herzegovina managers
Expatriate football managers in Azerbaijan
Bosnia and Herzegovina expatriate sportspeople in Azerbaijan
Expatriate football managers in Syria
Expatriate football managers in Tajikistan
Expatriate football managers in Japan
Expatriate football managers in Jordan
Expatriate football managers in Saudi Arabia
Expatriate football managers in Iran
Bosnia and Herzegovina expatriate sportspeople in Iran
Bosnia and Herzegovina expatriate sportspeople in Saudi Arabia
Bosnia and Herzegovina expatriate sportspeople in Syria
Bosnia and Herzegovina expatriate sportspeople in Japan
Bosnia and Herzegovina expatriate sportspeople in Jordan
Bosnia and Herzegovina expatriate sportspeople in Tajikistan